The Alpine Town of the Year award is given to towns which have made exceptional efforts for the realization of the Alpine Convention and for sustainable development. The Alpine Towns of the Year are members of the international association of the same name.

The Alpine Town of the Year Award
The honorary title Alpine Town of the Year is awarded annually by the general meeting of the association's members at the recommendation of a jury. The jury examines the projects and proposals of the candidates on the basis of ecological, social and economic criteria. Every town in the area covered by the Alpine Convention can apply for the award.
The designated Alpine Town of the Year organizes a workshop during which its programme is presented at least six months before the actual Alpine Town Year. During the Alpine Town Year, there will be at least three international events, and two sustainable projects will be realized.  
The award and the cooperation across linguistic and geographical borders put the participating towns into the limelight, give wide publicity to their efforts for sustainable development and strengthen the links among the participating towns. The Alpine Town Year can also stimulate the realization of projects: the Dobratsch Nature Park in Villach (Austria), for example, is based on the Alpine Town concept.

Objectives
The Alpine Town of the Year Association has five objectives:
 Strengthening awareness of the Alps as a space where people and nature coexist.
 Involving the population in the programme and projects of the Alpine Town of the Year.
 Strengthening links within the region through cooperation with the hinterland.
 Creating a sustainable future by realizing the basic concept of the Alpine Convention through concrete projects.
 Increasing cooperation among the towns in the Alps.

The Alpine Town of the Year Association
The towns which have received the Alpine Town of the Year award cooperate in the association. The association has an office in Bad Reichenhall, Germany.

The Jury
The jury examines the submissions and makes a recommendation on the next Alpine Town of the Year to the General Meeting. It provides the town with advice on substantive issues and receives the town's final report. The jury consists of three representatives of Alpine-wide organizations. They are elected every two years by the General Meeting. The present members are Norbert Weixlbaumer (CIPRA International), Cristina Del Biaggio (University of Ginevra), Antonio Zambon (Community Network Alliance in the Alps) and Gerhard Leeb (Pro Vita Alpina).

The General Assembly
The representatives of the Alpine Towns of the Year meet twice a year in a different town. The General Assembly elects the Alpine Town of the Year, the jury and the Board, and determines the overall orientation of the association's activities. The General Association also serves as a personal communication platform among the towns, overcoming linguistic barriers.

The Board
The Board has three to five members - burgomasters or their legitimate representatives. The Board is responsible for the day-to-day activities of the association. Its present members are Thierry Billet (president, Annecy), Bojan Sever (vice president, Idrija), Ingrid Fischer (assessor, Sonthofen).

The Consultant
Every town designates a contact person or consultant who serves as the interface between the town, the other members and the association's office. The consultant is also responsible for the local realization of the association's objectives.

The Office
The office is responsible for the association's day-to-day activities; it has been run by CIPRA International since 2003. CIPRA has been represented on the jury since 1997.

Projects
Every Alpine town implements at least two local projects reflecting the association's objectives in its Alpine Town Year. These are stored in an online data bank. In addition, any other projects are regularly presented in the association's newsletter, which appears in four languages.
The Alpine Town Association is a partner in the Alpine Space Programme Alpstar. The project's objective is to make the Alps a climate-neutral region. The project started in July 2011 and will end in March 2014.

Cooperation

The Alpine Convention
In 2008, the Permanent Secretariat of the Alpine Convention and the association signed a Memorandum of Understanding for continuous cooperation. The association has been an official observer with the Alpine Convention since 2011.  As such, the association takes part in the meetings of the Permanent Commission and in the biennial Alpine Conference. The association has no voting rights but can submit its proposals directly to the policy makers of the participating countries.

The Municipal Network Alliance in the Alps
There is a regular exchange of information between the municipal network Alliance in the Alps and the association, for example during the joint meetings of the Boards. In addition, there are towns which are members of both networks, such as Sonthofen and Annecy.

The International Commission for the Protection of the Alps (CIPRA) runs the association's office and is represented on the jury. The association and CIPRA, among other things, jointly organize events. An international meeting in Lecco (Italy), for example, is planned in 2013.

The Alpine Towns

References

External links 
 www.alpenstaedte.org or www.cittaalpina.org, Association Alpine Town of the Year – official website

Community awards